Petnjica is a town in northern Montenegro, and the center of Petnjica Municipality. Petnjica regained its municipality status on May 28, 2013, which it previously had from 1945 to 1957, when it was merged with the Berane Municipality.

Demographics
Village is the administrative center of Petnjica Municipality, which had a population of 5,482 in 2011. The settlement itself had a population of 539.

Ethnic groups in 2011

Sports
The local football team is FK Petnjica, who play in the country's third tier. They play their home games at the Gusare Stadium.

Notable people
Osman Rastoder, commander of Sandžak Muslim militia
Rifat Rastoder, Montenegrin politician
Šerbo Rastoder, Montenegrin historian

International relations 

Petnjica is twinned with:

 Rumelange, Luxembourg

References

External links
FC Petnjica

Populated places in Petnjica Municipality
Populated places in Montenegro
States and territories established in 2013
Populated places in Berane Municipality
Cities in Montenegro